John Bird Hine (1868 – 4 February 1954) was a Reform Party Member of Parliament in the Taranaki region of New Zealand. He was Minister of Internal Affairs from 1919 to 1920 in the Reform Government.

He won the Stratford electorate in the 1908 general election, and held it to 1919, when he was defeated by Robert Masters of the Liberal Party.

In 1935, he was awarded the King George V Silver Jubilee Medal.

Hine died on 4 February 1954, and was buried at Kopuatama Cemetery in Stratford.

References

1868 births
1954 deaths
Reform Party (New Zealand) MPs
Unsuccessful candidates in the 1919 New Zealand general election
Unsuccessful candidates in the 1922 New Zealand general election
Unsuccessful candidates in the 1905 New Zealand general election
Members of the New Zealand House of Representatives
New Zealand MPs for North Island electorates
Burials at Kopuatama Cemetery